Cadwallader Davis Blayney, 12th Baron Blayney (19 December 1802 – 18 January 1874), styled The Honourable from birth until 1834, was an Irish nobleman and politician.

Born in Dover Street in London, he was the son of Andrew Blayney, 11th Baron Blayney and his wife Marbella, the eldest daughter of James Alexander, 1st Earl of Caledon.

Blayney was commissioned into the Army as an ensign in the 4th Regiment of Foot on 7 June 1821. He exchanged into the Rifle Brigade as a second lieutenant on 5 July. He purchased a lieutenancy in the 89th Regiment of Foot on 27 January 1825. On 9 April 1825, he exchanged back into the Rifle Brigade, and then to the 7th Regiment of Foot on 9 November. He was promoted to captain in 1826 and went on half-pay. On 7 June 1827, he came off half-pay by exchanging into the 80th Regiment of Foot, and retired from the Army in 1830.

Blayney entered the British House of Commons in 1830 as Tory Member of Parliament (MP) for Monaghan and held the seat until he succeeded his father as baron in 1834. Seven years later, he was elected a representative peer and joined the House of Lords. He sold the family estate, Castleblayney, Ireland, to Henry Thomas Hope of Deepdene, Surrey in 1852. Blayney died in London without issue aged 71, at the St. James Hotel, Piccadilly, London, after living in the Carlton Club there. The title became extinct on his death.

He is buried in Kensal Green Cemetery north-west of the main chapel.

See also 
 Baron Blayney

References 

1802 births
1874 deaths
Barons Blayney
Burials at Kensal Green Cemetery
Irish representative peers
Members of the Parliament of the United Kingdom for County Monaghan constituencies (1801–1922)
Politicians from County Monaghan
Tory MPs (pre-1834)
UK MPs 1830–1831
UK MPs 1831–1832
UK MPs 1832–1835
UK MPs who inherited peerages
Royal Irish Fusiliers officers
King's Own Royal Regiment officers
Rifle Brigade officers
Royal Fusiliers officers
South Staffordshire Regiment officers
Military personnel from London